Brčko is a city and the administrative seat of Brčko District, in northern Bosnia and Herzegovina. It lies on the banks of Sava river across from Croatia. As of 2013, it has a population of 39,893 inhabitants.

De jure, the Brčko District belongs to both entities of Bosnia and Herzegovina (the Federation of Bosnia and Herzegovina and Republika Srpska) but in practice it is not governed by either; practically, Brčko is a self-governing free city.

Name
Its name is very likely linked to the Breuci (Greek Βρεῦκοι), a subtribe of Pannonian tribes of the Illyrians who migrated to the vicinity of today's Brčko from the territories of the Yamnaya culture in the 3rd millennium BC. Breuci greatly resisted the Romans but were conquered in 1st century BC and many were sold as slaves after their defeat. They started receiving Roman citizenship during Trajan's rule.

A number of Breuci migrated and settled in Dacia, where a town called Bereck or Brețcu, a river (Brețcu River) and a mountain Munții Brețcului in today's Romania were named after them.

Geography

The city is on the north, riparian border of Bosnia, across the Sava River from the village of Gunja in Croatia.

Brčko is the seat of the Brčko District, an independent unit of local self-government created on the territory of Bosnia and Herzegovina following an arbitration process. The local administration was formerly supervised by an international supervisory regime headed by Principal Deputy High Representative who is also ex officio the Brčko International Supervisor. This international supervision was frozen since 23 May 2012.

History
Brčko was a geographic point of contention in 1996 when the U.S.-led Implementation Force (IFOR) built Camp McGovern on the outskirts of the city. Camp McGovern under the overwatch of 3-5 CAV 1/BDE/1AR Division (US) commanded by LTC Anthony Cucolo was constructed from a war torn farming cooperative structure in the Zone of Separation (ZOS) for the purpose of establishing peacekeeping operations. The mission was to separate the forming warring factions. The ZOS was one kilometer wide of no man's land, where special permission was required for Serbian or Bosnian forces to enter. Various checkpoints and observation points (OP's) were established to control the separation.

Although Brčko was a focal point for tension in the late 1990s, considerable progress in multi-ethnic integration in Brčko has since occurred including integration of secondary schooling. Reconstruction efforts and the Property Law Implementation Plan have improved the situation regarding property and return.
Today, Brčko has returned to a strategic transshipment point along the Sava River. The population of Brčko has not returned to its pre-war ethnic mix of Bosniaks, Serbs, and Croats. Brčko sits at the east–west apex of Republika Srpska, the ethnic Serb portion of Bosnia & Herzegovina, and as such is critical to the RS for its economic future.

Brčko was one of the main points discussed in the Dayton Peace Accords. After several weeks of intensive negotiation, the issue of Brčko was to be decided by international arbitration. Brčko Arbitration ruled in May 1997 that Brčko would be a special district managed by an ambassadorial representative from the international community. The first Ambassador to Brčko was an American with support staff from the UK, Sweden, Denmark & France.

The first international organization to open office in Brčko at that time was the Organization for Security and Cooperation in Europe (OSCE) headed by Randolph Hampton.

Following PIC meeting on 23 May 2012, it was decided to suspend, not terminate, the mandate of Brčko International Supervisor. Brčko Arbitral Tribunal, together with the suspended Brčko Supervision, will still continue to exist.

Demographics

Transport

Rail

A railway station is near the city centre on the line from Vinkovci to Tuzla. However, no passenger trains operate to Brčko anymore. The closest operating railway station is in Gunja, Croatia; just on the other side of the border.

Water 
Brčko has the largest river port in Bosnia, on the Sava river.

Sport
Brčko has three football clubs (FK Jedinstvo Brčko, FK Lokomotiva Brčko, FK Izbor Brčko, FK Dizdaruša Brčko and the youngest club FK Ilićka 01). They all play in the Second League of Republika Srpska. 
The city is home to some of the most successful volleyball teams in the country Mladost and Jedinstvo.

Education
The city is home to an economics school of the University of East Sarajevo and a local theatre festival.

Gallery

Twin towns – sister cities

Brčko is twinned with:
 Samsun, Turkey
 Smederevska Palanka, Serbia
 St. Louis, United States

Notable people
Edo Maajka, rapper
Lepa Brena, singer
Edvin Kanka Ćudić, human rights activist
Mladen Petrić, Croatian footballer
Vesna Pisarović, singer
Dženana Šehanović, pianist
Anton Maglica, Croatian footballer
Jasmin Imamović, politician
Nataša Vojnović, Serbian fashion model
Mato Tadić, judge
Brankica Mihajlović, Serbian volleyball player, World and European champion, silver medalist at the 2016 Summer Olympics
Ines Janković, Serbian fashion designer
Nikola Kovač, Professional Counter Strike Global Offensive player

See also

 Brčko bridge massacre

References

External links
 
 Brčanski Informativni portal

Brčko District
Bosnia and Herzegovina–Croatia border crossings